The 2003 Speedway World Cup Qualification (SWC) was a  series of motorcycle speedway meetings used to determine the three national teams to qualify for the 2003 Speedway World Cup. According to the FIM rules the top nine nations from the 2002 Speedway World Cup were automatically qualified.

Results 

 Qualifying round
  Daugavpils

Heat details 

 Qualifying round
 11 May 2003
  Daugavpils, Latvijas Spidveja Centrs

References

See also 
 2003 Speedway World Cup

Q